The Ministry of Interior and Federal Affairs (Arabic: وزارة الداخلية) is the Interior ministry of Somalia and is the responsible authority for national security, Federal affairs, naturalization, immigration and customs in Somalia. It was founded in 1967 after the combined ministerial body covering financial and interior affairs were separated.

References

Government of Somalia